The Paramount Theatre is a live theatre venue/movie theatre located in downtown Austin, Texas. The classical revival style structure was built in 1915. The building was listed in the National Register of Historic Places on June 23, 1976.

In the Paramount's 100-year history, it has played host to a wide variety of acts ranging from vaudeville, musicals, legitimate theater, and movies, including premieres of such films as 1966's Batman.

History
The four-story theater was built by Ernest Nalle, who commissioned architect John Eberson to design the building in January 1915. The theater opened under the name "The Majestic" on October 11, 1915, and hosted various vaudeville performers including the Marx Brothers. In 1930, the theater was purchased by Karl Hoblitzelle, who renamed it to the "Paramount Theatre" and added carpeting, upholstered seating, and the addition of a giant lighted blade sign reading "Paramount". In 1941, the theater was purchased by the Margaret Reed Estate. In November 1963, the building's facade received a renovation. The renovation included the removal and reprogramming of the signature blade sign. However, the sign was never re-installed and its fate was never revealed.

By the 1970s, the popularity of television and suburban movie theaters led to a decline in theater attendance. In 1975, proprietors John M. Bernardoni, Charles Eckerman, and Stephen L. Scott formed a nonprofit group to restore the building, which was in deteriorating condition. Local philanthropist Roberta Crenshaw, who owned a 50% stake in the building through her late husband's estate, donated her half of the trust to the nonprofit, meanwhile, the other half of the trust offered a 99-year lease. In 1976, the theater's listing on the National Register of Historic Places qualified the venue for federal restoration funds. Renovations began in September 1977 following a $1.85 million grant from the federal government, which was also used to spur economic development in Downtown Austin.

In 2015, the theater embarked on an effort to recreate the signature blade sign that was lost in 1963. Since there were no known architectural or engineering plans for the original sign, the designers analyzed old footage of the theatre that included the sign. On September 23, 2015, the blade sign was lit for the first time in over 50 years.

Gallery

References

External links

Paramount Theatre History

Cinemas and movie theaters in Texas
City of Austin Historic Landmarks
Theatres in Texas
Culture of Austin, Texas
Buildings and structures in Austin, Texas
Theatres completed in 1915
Theatres on the National Register of Historic Places in Texas
National Register of Historic Places in Austin, Texas
Recorded Texas Historic Landmarks